Geeth Silva (born 17 September 1984) is a Sri Lankan cricketer. He made his Twenty20 debut on 17 August 2004, for Sebastianites Cricket and Athletic Club in the 2004 SLC Twenty20 Tournament. He made his first-class debut for Sebastianites Cricket and Athletic Club in the 2007–08 Premier Trophy on 18 January 2008.

References

External links
 

1984 births
Living people
Sri Lankan cricketers
Sri Lanka Police Sports Club cricketers
Sebastianites Cricket and Athletic Club cricketers
Place of birth missing (living people)